Dominic Ross Hunn (born August 22, 1984), better known by his stage name Dom Kennedy, is an American rapper from Leimert Park, Los Angeles, California. Since 2008, Kennedy has released 5 independent mixtapes, most notably his 2010 critically acclaimed mixtape From the Westside with Love. His first commercial studio album From the Westside with Love II was released on iTunes June 28, 2011. Despite it being his iTunes debut, FTWSWL2 received "a top 10 spot on Hip Hop/Rap albums chart during its release week" and was Kennedy's first album associated with The OpM Company, Kennedy's self-established record label. His song "My Type of Party" was ranked by Complex at #43 in the magazine's Best 50 Songs of 2012 list.

Early life
Dom Kennedy was born on August 22, 1984 in Los Angeles, California. In an interview with music media outlet IMFlashy, Kennedy describes his childhood growing up as "normal". After his parents' divorce, Kennedy moved with his mother to Leimert Park. Kennedy played baseball to get out of the inner city to stay safe and out of trouble. He also played basketball everyday from the age of five to the age of 16. Upon graduating from Santa Monica high school, Kennedy enrolled in Santa Monica College, a two-year junior college in California, majoring in business management. In an interview with Dr. Josh Hamilton in October 2012, Dom gave his reasoning on why he entered college and what his plan B would be.

"I mainly focused on business management while I was there, not really thinking about music per se at first, but just on life. You know, like damn if I wasn't rapping or doing anything with music that was kind of where I saw myself in the world. I always hoped I could be an entrepreneur, you know I guess, but thats the aspirations of many people but I just felt like if I was going to learn about anything I might as well learn about structures of corporations, or at least find out everyone's job."

Music career
Working with his cousin Jason Madison, Kennedy released his debut mixtape album 25th Hour in 2008, instantly producing a buzz throughout the south side of L.A. In particular, the song "Watermelon Sundae" was widely played on local radio stations and performed live throughout the area, bringing more attention to Kennedy's music ambitions. Around this time, Kennedy's cousin Madison was a film student at Loyola Marymount University, sparking the beginning importance of visuals in Kennedy's later projects.

After his 25th Hour debut, Kennedy released 2 additional mixtapes in 2009; Best After Bobby (the title referring to "Bobby" Robert F. Kennedy), and Future Street/Drug Sounds. For the Best After Bobby mixtape, Kennedy collaborated with West Coast heavy hitter DJ Sour Milk and the Los Angeles Leakers, producing an instant buzz in underground circles across the country. Within the first hours of dropping the mixtape, Kennedy amassed over 10,000 downloads, officially solidifying his name among some of the top rappers in L.A.

However, with the release of From the Westside With Love in 2010, Kennedy became a major hit throughout the underground hip hop scene in L.A. Gaining over 100,000 internet downloads, With the success of From the Westside With Love, Kennedy became a major player on the independent circuit, traveling for performances throughout and outside the country; including a show in Djibouti, Africa. Kennedy also began releasing an extensive amount of visual material at this time, including From the Westside With Love music videos for songs such as "1997", "Locals Only", and "The 4 Heartbeats".

In early 2011, Kennedy released his 5th studio mixtape The Original Dom Kennedy, a tape meant to reflect Kennedy's individuality and sound as an artist. In an interview with MTV News reporter James Lacsina, Kennedy described the project as something that was a testament to himself in the rap game as well as the city he proudly represents:

Kennedy also took a personal stance in the mixtape against major hip hop DJ and producer Funkmaster Flex. On his song "The Homies", Kennedy takes shots at Flex's disparaging remarks regarding the late California rapper Tupac Shakur: "Shit I heard Funk Flex say that Pac ain't shit/ and I hope when you see him that he slap your mouth/"
In 2011, Kennedy performed at premier film festival South by Southwest's Music Matters Show in Albuquerque, New Mexico. The show was hosted by cable entertainment network Black Entertainment Television. Both his performance and that of East Coast rapper J. Cole's were featured online by major, hip hop music magazine The Source (magazine). Kennedy performed his first show outside of the U.S. also in 2011 in Djibouti, Africa.

Following the release of From the Westside With Love II, Kennedy headlined at The Key Club in West Hollywood, California alongside fellow West Coast rappers Overdoz, Epic Twelve, and Black Cobain. Marketed as the show on "7.1.11", the event was sold out, prompting another show the following week, marketed as the "7.7.11" show.

In 2012, Kennedy traveled throughout Europe and the United States for his Yellow Album World Tour. The tour started in London in October and wrapped up in San Francisco in December.

In early 2013, Interscope Records attempted to sign Dom Kennedy, however he chose to remain independent. His second studio album Get Home Safely was released through his The Other People's Money Company record label on October 15, 2013. The album featured guest appearances from Skeme, Krondon, TeeFLii, Ty Dolla Sign and Nipsey Hussle. Get Home Safely debuted at number 29 in its first week, selling more than 10,000 copies in the United States.

On June 2, 2015, Dom Kennedy released his third studio album entitled, By Dom Kennedy.  The album peaked at number 23 on the Billboard 200, selling 9,000 copies the first week. On December 23, 2016, Dom Kennedy released his fourth studio album entitled, Los Angeles Is Not For Sale, Vol. 1.

Dom Kennedy teamed up with Hit-Boy in order to create their own Hip-Hop group entitled Half-A-Mil. They would go on to release three self-titled EP's that dropped sporadically throughout late 2016 into mid 2017. Then later officially released their debut album Courtesy Of Half-A-Mil on November 24, 2017. In 2019, Kennedy was featured in Kehlani's song "Nunya" from her mixtape, While We Wait. He also appeared in the song's music video, which was released on February 20, 2019.

Additional Information 
In 2014 Dom Kennedy signed Los-Angeles based rap group, Warm Brew to his independent-label OPM.

Influences
Kennedy is often heard proclaiming his hometown rep one liner "Leimert Park what's cool". As a kid, Kennedy describes himself as being highly influenced by artists such as "The Notorious B.I.G., Outkast, 2Pac, and LL Cool J" through the fact that by simply listening to their music, he could feel a sense of where they were from. With his music, Kennedy does the same thing, bringing the feel of the inner city streets of L.A. to anyone willing to listen. In an interview with Hip Hop DX, Kennedy talks about the influence behind the L.A. sound in his music:

Kennedy has rapped over a wide range of past and present hip hop beats in his career, consistently bringing the element of L.A. and West Coast hip hop to his music. Such beats include Big Poppa on the track "Notorious Dom" (25th Hour) and Best I Ever Had on the track "Best You Never Had" (Best After Bobby). South by Southwest reports major music executive John Monopoly as saying "He is going to get signed".

Musical style and recognition
In 2011, Kennedy was recognized as one of the leading artist in a new wave of West coast hip hop artist. Dom Kennedy is known for his laid back flow, wordplay and unique storytelling.

Discography

Studio albums

Mixtapes

Guest appearances

References

African-American male rappers
African-American songwriters
Rappers from Los Angeles
Underground rappers
West Coast hip hop musicians
Songwriters from California
1984 births
Living people
People from South Los Angeles
People from Hanford, California
Santa Monica College alumni
21st-century American rappers
21st-century American male musicians
21st-century African-American musicians
20th-century African-American people
American male songwriters